Arriva Midlands East, is a bus company operating services in Leicestershire. It is a trading division of Arriva Midlands which is a subsidiary of Arriva plc which is itself owned by the government of Germany through Deutsche Bahn.

History

In September 1981 Midland Red East was formed with 181 buses operating from five depots in Derbyshire, Leicestershire, Lincolnshire and Nottinghamshire as part of the breakup of the Midland Red bus company, and in January 1984 was renamed Midland Fox. In 1987 it was privatised in a management buyout. Several smaller operators including Loughborough Bus & Coach Company were purchased and in 1989 it was sold to the Drawlane Group. In November 1992 it was sold to British Bus which in August 1996 was sold to the Cowie Group.

In September 1996 the Sandacre Street, Leicester depot was closed. In November 1997 the Cowie Group was renamed Arriva and Midland Fox was rebranded as Arriva Fox County. In 2003 Arriva Fox County merged with Arriva Derby and Arriva Midland North to form Arriva Midlands.

On 11 July 2009 the Southgates depot closed and then on 3 October 2011 the Thurmaston depot and head office moved to a new purpose built depot on Westmoreland Avenue.

Arriva operated services around the Hinckley area until August 2008 when the operations were sold to Centrebus Holdings, a joint venture between Centrebus and Arriva. Arriva regained the Hinckley operations during 2013 when Centrebus ended their involvement in Centrebus Holdings and Arriva rebranded the Hinckley operation as Hinckley Bus, During late 2018 Arriva merged the Hinckley Bus services into their Leicestershire operations with the Hinckley Bus name ceasing to exist.

Services
Arriva operate most of their services around Leicester from either Haymarket or St Margaret's Bus Stations with a number of services operating from on-street stops within the city centre.

Services around the Coalville area are operated from on-street stops around Marlborough Square and Memorial Square, while local services in Hinckley are operated from Hinckley Bus station located on Waterloo Road.

Depots
Arriva operate from three depots across Leicestershire in Barwell, Coalville, and Thurmaston which is the headquarters for Arriva Midlands. Until October 2021 there was a fourth depot located in South Wigston but this closed after being open since 1957 with most services being transferred to Thurmaston depot.

Until their cessation in July 2022, ArrivaClick services around Leicester are based at the Barwell depot.

Fleet
As of June 2022 the fleet consists of 205+ vehicles.

Arriva have repainted one of their DAF DB250 Wright Pulsar Gemini's into the Midland Fox livery as a nod to Leicester's heritage during 2019.

During 2021 Leicester City Council successfully applied for £11 million of funding from the Government's ZEBRA scheme, which was used for Arriva Midlands to order 22 Wright StreetDeck Electroliner battery electric buses, which are scheduled to be delivered for use on services across Leicester in October 2023. They are to be Arriva's first electric double-deck buses delivered outside London.

See also
List of bus operators of the United Kingdom

References

External links

Arriva Midlands website

Fox County
Transport in Leicestershire
Bus operators in Leicestershire